Khovd is one of the 21 aimags (provinces) of Mongolia, located in the west of the country. Its capital is also named Khovd.

The Khovd province is approximately 1,580 km from Ulaanbaatar, Mongolia's capital. It takes its name from the Khovd River, which is located in this province.

Population 
Khovd is distinguished by its multi-cultural population. It is home to more than 17 nationalities and ethnicities. Each of these groups has its own distinct traditional dwelling and settlement pattern, dress and other cultural distinctions, literary, artistic, and musical traditions.

The Khovd aimag population growth stopped in 1991, then migration out of the aimag (approx. 20,000 in 1992-2004) compensated the natural increase and confined aimag’s population within the limits of 87 thousand to 92 thousand since.

Climate
Khovd is notorious for its harsh weather, for temperatures regularly reach as high as  during summer and as low as  during winter. The climate is dry, as it receives approximately the same average annual precipitation as Phoenix, Arizona.

Rivers
The major rivers are:
Khovd River 
Bulgan River 
Buyant River
Hoid tsenher River 
Dund tsenher River 
Uench River  
Bodonch River

Lakes
Khar-Us Nuur 
Khar Nuur
Dörgön Nuur
Tsetseg lake

Mountains
Altai Mountains
Jargalant hairhan
Bumbat hairhan
Baatar hairhan
Monkh hairhan
Baitag bogd

Transportation
The Khovd Airport (HVD/ZMKD) has two runways, one of which is paved, and gets served by regular flights from and to Ulaanbaatar, Mörön, and Bulgan. And flights are planned to Ürümqi city of Xingjiang.

Economy 
The region around the Khovd city is famous in Mongolia for its watermelon crop. There is a sizable hydroelectric dam-building project underway that will theoretically generate enough electricity to power the three most western aimags (Uvs, Bayan-Ölgii, and Khovd). The city of Khovd is connected to the Russian power grid and subject to blackouts if it falls behind in its payments. Domestic and international tourism and sports hunting are a sizable industry of Khovd province. The natural environment, fresh and salt water lakes, mountains, valleys, caves, ancient rock paintings and fortresses are other sightseeing attractions.

Animal herding is the main economy of this province.

Administrative subdivisions 

The aimag capital Khovd is geographically located in the Buyant sum, but is administered as independent Jargalant sum. The administrative center of the Khovd Sum is also called Khovd, which is a common source of confusion. The other administrative centers carry the name of the respective Sum as well.

* - The aimag capital Khovd

References

Citations

Sources 

 Natalia Rudaya, Pavel Tarasov, Nadezhda Dorofeyuk... Holocene environments and climate in the Mongolian Altai reconstructed from the Hoton-Nur pollen and diatom records: a step towards better understanding climate dynamics in Central Asia // Quaternary Science Reviews
 Expedition trip to the North-West Mongolia, Tomsk State University and the University of Hovd, cooperation. Video. 

 
Provinces of Mongolia
1931 establishments in Mongolia
States and territories established in 1931